James Wanene (born 14 August 1961) is a Kenyan boxer. He competed in the men's light flyweight event at the 1992 Summer Olympics.

References

External links
 

1961 births
Living people
Kenyan male boxers
Olympic boxers of Kenya
Boxers at the 1992 Summer Olympics
Sportspeople from Nairobi
Light-flyweight boxers